Atrina pectinata is a species of bivalves belonging to the family Pinnidae. 

The species is found in the Old World. They are important in commercial fishing in Asia. They have the common name of 'pen shells.

References

Pinnidae
Taxa named by Carl Linnaeus
Bivalves described in 1767
Edible molluscs